Jung Han-hae (born April 7, 1990), better known by the mononym Hanhae, is a South Korean rapper and singer. He is a former member of the hip hop boy band Phantom.

Discography

Extended plays

Singles

Filmography

Television shows

Web shows

Awards and nominations

References

External links

1990 births
Living people
South Korean male rappers
South Korean hip hop singers
People from Busan
Brand New Music artists
Show Me the Money (South Korean TV series) contestants
21st-century South Korean  male singers